Ternove (Ukrainian: Тернове), formerly and still commonly known as Novopetrivske (Ukrainian: Новопетрівьске) is a village located in the Dnipropetrovsk Oblast, in Ukraine.

Geography 
The village of Ternove is located approximately 1 km away from much larger Berezove and is close to the joint borders of Zaporizhzhia and Donetsk Oblasts. A drying stream with a dam flows through the village. It has an elevation of 147 meters.

History 
The village was founded in 1922. Immediately after the defeat of the UPR, two villages were formed: Ternovy and Petrovsky, named after the "all-Ukrainian headman" Grigory Petrovsky. Over time, the number of villages has increased significantly, and the villages have been united. A village was formed, which the local authorities called Novopetrivske, which was later renamed sometime in 2015 to Ternove. In 2022, Russian troops shelled the village and surrounding areas. Reports from Ukrainian military groups suggest this village alongside Berezove, Novoheorhiivka and Zaporizke were attacked and then occupied for an unknown period of time, evincing that the Russian troops entered Dnipropetrovsk Oblast. Ukrainian military claimed to have cleared Russian troops from the village on March 14, 2022.

References 

Villages in Synelnykove Raion